Crowbar is the second studio album by American sludge metal band Crowbar, released on October 12, 1993. It sold 100,000 copies on the now defunct independent label Pavement Music. The singles "All I Had (I Gave)" and "Existence Is Punishment" were played on MTV and received international attention. Crowbar was recorded in New Orleans in 1992 and produced by Phil Anselmo, a childhood friend of Crowbar's founder Kirk Windstein and singer of Pantera.

Track listing
All songs written by Crowbar, except where noted.

Personnel
Kirk Windstein – vocals, rhythm guitar
Matt Thomas – lead guitar
Todd Strange – bass
Craig Nunenmacher – drums

Music videos
"All I Had (I Gave)"
"Existence Is Punishment"

Both videos appeared on Beavis and Butt-Head. Butt-Head commented that vocalist Kirk Windstein looked like he was defecating on the toilet and that the band's music sounded "slow and fat". "Existence Is Punishment" appears on the Beavis and Butt-Head: The Mike Judge Collection #3 DVD.

References

1993 albums
Crowbar (American band) albums
Albums produced by Phil Anselmo